Shawn Martin Jordan (born October 24, 1984) is an American professional mixed martial artist who last competed in the Professional Fighters League's Heavyweight division. A professional competitor since 2009, Jordan has also formerly competed for Strikeforce, Bellator MMA and the Ultimate Fighting Championship.

Background
Shawn Jordan was born and raised in El Paso, Texas, attending Riverside High School where he excelled in football, basketball, wrestling, and track and field. Jordan was a two-time state champion in wrestling, was ranked as one of the top ten fullbacks in the country for football, and was the starting center on the basketball team for his freshman, sophomore, and junior seasons. Jordan continued his football career with a scholarship to Louisiana State University (LSU) under coach Nick Saban and then coach Les Miles where he was a member of LSU's 2003 BCS National Championship and 2007 BCS National Championship teams.

Shawn Jordan also had a cameo appearance in the film Philly Kid where he portrayed a Russian fighter by the name of Andres Titov.

Mixed martial arts career

Early career
Jordan made his amateur mixed martial arts debut in February 2008, which he lost. He rebounded in January 2009 with a TKO victory.

He made his professional mixed martial arts debut in May 2009 for Bellator and won via submission. Jordan then competed in various promotions over the next three years, amassing a record of 11–2 before joining Strikeforce.

Strikeforce
Jordan debuted for the promotion on June 22, 2011, where he lost a unanimous decision to Devin Cole. Three months later Jordan fought Lavar Johnson, whom he defeated via submission in the second round.

With the dissolution of the Strikeforce Heavyweight division, Jordan was one of the first announced Heavyweight fighters to make the transition to the UFC.

Ultimate Fighting Championship
Jordan made his official debut against UFC newcomer Oli Thompson at UFC on FX 2. He won the fight via TKO in the second round after dominating the fight with his striking.

In his second UFC fight, Jordan replaced an injured Antônio Rodrigo Nogueira to face Cheick Kongo on July 21, 2012 at UFC 149. He lost the fight via unanimous decision.

Jordan faced Mike Russow on January 26, 2013 at UFC on Fox: Johnson vs. Dodson. Despite losing the first round to Russow, Jordan was able to mount a comeback in the second round and won via TKO.

Jordan faced Pat Barry on June 15, 2013 at UFC 161.  Jordan defeated Barry via first-round TKO. The win also delivered Jordan his first Knockout of the Night bonus award.

Jordan faced Gabriel Gonzaga on October 19, 2013 at UFC 166. He lost the fight via knockout at 1:33 of the first round.

Jordan faced Matt Mitrione on March 1, 2014 at UFC Fight Night: Kim vs. Hathaway. He lost the fight via knockout at 4:59 of the first round.

Jordan next faced Jack May at UFC Fight Night 47 on August 16, 2014. He won the back-and-forth fight via TKO in the third round.

Jordan faced UFC newcomer Jared Cannonier at UFC 182 on January 3, 2015. He won the fight via knockout in the first round.  The win also earned Jordan his first Performance of the Night bonus award.

Jordan had a rematch with Derrick Lewis on June 6, 2015 at UFC Fight Night 68. In their first encounter on the regional circuit in 2010, Jordan won by unanimous decision. He won the fight by technical knockout in the second round.  The win also earned Jordan his second consecutive Performance of the Night bonus award.

Jordan faced Ruslan Magomedov in the last fight of his contract on October 3, 2015 at UFC 192. He lost the fight via unanimous decision.

World Series of Fighting
On April 28, 2016 it was announced that Jordan had signed a contract with World Series of Fighting.

Jordan faced Ashley Gooch on October 7, 2016 at WSOF 33. He won the fight via TKO in the first round.

On January 1, 2017 it was announced that Jordan would face reigning heavyweight champion Blagoy Ivanov for the title at WSOF 35.  The event was originally scheduled for February 28 (incorrectly reported as Feb 25) but was rescheduled to March 18. Jordan lost the fight via TKO in the first round.

Jordan faced Josh Copeland on July 19, 2018 at PFL 4. He lost the fight via unanimous decision.

Championships and accomplishments
 Ultimate Fighting Championship
Knockout of the Night (One time)  
Performance of the Night (Two times)

Mixed martial arts record

|-
|Loss
|align=center|19–9
|Josh Copeland
|Decision (unanimous)
|PFL 4
|
|align=center|3
|align=center|5:00
|Uniondale, New York, United States 
| 
|-
|Loss
|align=center|19–8
|Blagoy Ivanov
|TKO (punches)
|WSOF 35
|
|align=center|1
|align=center|1:43
|Verona, New York, United States
| 
|-
|Win
|align=center|19–7
|Ashley Gooch
|TKO (punches)
|WSOF 33
|
|align=center|1
|align=center|4:40
|Kansas City, Missouri, United States
|
|-
| Loss
| align=center|18–7
| Ruslan Magomedov
| Decision (unanimous)
| UFC 192
| 
| align=center| 3
| align=center| 5:00
| Houston, Texas, United States
| 
|-
| Win
| align=center|18–6
| Derrick Lewis
| TKO (hook kick and punches)
| UFC Fight Night: Boetsch vs. Henderson
| 
| align=center| 2
| align=center| 0:48
| New Orleans, Louisiana, United States
| 
|-
| Win
| align=center|17–6
| Jared Cannonier
| KO (punches)
| UFC 182
| 
| align=center| 1
| align=center| 2:57
| Las Vegas, Nevada, United States
| 
|-
| Win
| align=center| 16–6
| Jack May
| TKO (punches)
| UFC Fight Night: Bader vs. St. Preux
| 
| align=center| 3
| align=center| 2:55
| Bangor, Maine, United States
| 
|-
| Loss
| align=center| 15–6
| Matt Mitrione
| KO (punches)
| The Ultimate Fighter China Finale: Kim vs. Hathaway
| 
| align=center| 1
| align=center| 4:59
| Macau, SAR, China
| 
|-
| Loss
| align=center| 15–5
| Gabriel Gonzaga
| KO (punches)
| UFC 166
| 
| align=center| 1
| align=center| 1:33
| Houston, Texas, United States
| 
|-
| Win
| align=center| 15–4
| Pat Barry
| TKO (punches)
| UFC 161
| 
| align=center| 1
| align=center| 0:59
| Winnipeg, Manitoba, Canada
| 
|-
| Win
| align=center| 14–4
| Mike Russow
| TKO (punches)
| UFC on Fox: Johnson vs. Dodson
| 
| align=center| 2
| align=center| 3:48
| Chicago, Illinois, United States 
| 
|-
| Loss
| align=center| 13–4
| Cheick Kongo
| Decision (unanimous)
| UFC 149
| 
| align=center| 3
| align=center| 5:00
| Calgary, Alberta, Canada
| 
|-
| Win
| align=center| 13–3
| Oli Thompson
| TKO (knee and punches)
| UFC on FX: Alves vs. Kampmann
| 
| align=center| 2
| align=center| 1:07
| Sydney, Australia
| 
|-
| Win
| align=center| 12–3
| Lavar Johnson
| Submission (americana)
| Strikeforce Challengers: Larkin vs. Rossborough
| 
| align=center| 2
| align=center| 3:08
| Las Vegas, Nevada, United States
| 
|-
| Loss
| align=center| 11–3
| Devin Cole
| Decision (unanimous)
| Strikeforce Challengers: Voelker vs. Bowling III
| 
| align=center| 3
| align=center| 5:00
| Las Vegas, Nevada, United States
| 
|-
| Win
| align=center| 11–2
| Kendrick Watkins
| TKO (punches)
| Gladiator Promotions: Summer Knockouts
| 
| align=center| 1
| align=center| 0:19
| Denham Springs, Louisiana, United States
| 
|-
| Win
| align=center| 10–2
| John Hill
| TKO (punches and elbows)
| Bellator 45
| 
| align=center| 1
| align=center| 1:56
| Lake Charles, Louisiana, United States
| 
|-
| Loss
| align=center| 9–2
| Mark Holata
| KO (punch)
| Bellator 31
| 
| align=center| 1
| align=center| 1:13
| Lake Charles, Louisiana, United States
| 
|-
| Win
| align=center| 9–1
| James Hall	
| Submission (rear-naked choke) 
| USA MMA: Stacked
| 
| align=center| 1
| align=center| 0:45
| Baton Rouge, Louisiana, United States
| 
|-
| Win
| align=center| 8–1
| Derrick Lewis
| Decision (unanimous)
| Cajun Fighting Championships: Full Force
| 
| align=center| 3
| align=center| 5:00
| Lafayette, Louisiana, United States
| 
|-
| Win
| align=center| 7–1
| Kendrick Watkins	
| KO (punches)
| MMA Fight Force: The Final Chapter
| 
| align=center| 1
| align=center| 0:37
| Baton Rouge, Louisiana, United States
| 
|-
| Win
| align=center| 6–1
| Doug Williams
| TKO (punches)
| Bellator 18
| 
| align=center| 1
| align=center| 0:19
| Monroe, Louisiana, United States
| 
|-
| Win
| align=center| 5–1
| Marcus Kaiser
| TKO (punches)
| No Love Entertainment: War and Wheels
| 
| align=center| 1
| align=center| 0:54
| New Orleans, Louisiana, United States
| 
|-
| Win
| align=center| 4–1
| Corey Salter	
| TKO (punches)
| USA MMA: Louisiana vs. Florida
| 
| align=center| 1
| align=center| 3:18
| Baton Rouge, Louisiana, United States
| 
|-
| Loss
| align=center| 3–1
| Kenny Garner
| KO (punches)
| Atlas Fights: Cage Rage 2
| 
| align=center| 1
| align=center| 0:51
| Biloxi, Mississippi, United States
| 
|-
| Win
| align=center| 3–0
| Carlton Haselrig
| TKO (punches)
| UCFC: Rumble on the Rivers
| 
| align=center| 1
| align=center| 2:57
| Pittsburgh, Pennsylvania, United States
| 
|-
| Win
| align=center| 2–0
| Mahsea Bolea
| KO (punch)
| Raging Wolf 4: Defiance
| 
| align=center| 2
| align=center| 1:02
| Irving, New York, United States
| 
|-
| Win
| align=center| 1–0
| Jayme Mckinney
| Submission (arm-triangle choke)
| Bellator 9
| 
| align=center| 2
| align=center| 1:39
| Monroe, Louisiana, United States
|

Amateur mixed martial arts record 

|-
| Win
|align=center| 1–1
| Chris Kissam
| TKO (punches)
| No Love Entertainment: Full Throttle
| 
| align=center| 1
| align=center| 1:02
| New Orleans, Louisiana, United States
| 
|-
| Loss
|align=center| 0–1
| Scott Barrett
| TKO (punches)
| RMMA: Renaissance MMA 5
| 
| align=center| 1
| align=center| N/A
| Mandeville, Louisiana, United States
|

See also
 List of current WSOF fighters
 List of male mixed martial artists

References

External links
UFC Profile
Sherdog MMA Profile

1984 births
Living people
American male mixed martial artists
Heavyweight mixed martial artists
Mixed martial artists utilizing wrestling
LSU Tigers football players
Mixed martial artists from Texas
Sportspeople from El Paso, Texas
Ultimate Fighting Championship male fighters